Irakli Kovzanadze is a Georgian economist. He is CEO of JSC Partnership Fund, a Georgian state owned investment fund with an asset value of more than $3 billion.

Work
Professor Irakli Kovzanadze has published six books and more than 50 articles in economics, including problems of the genesis, development and manifestation of systemic banking crises, their forecasting and prevention
Being an MP he served as a chairman of Finance and Budget Committee of the Parliament of Georgia (2004–2008) and as a chairman of the Task Force of EBRD/ OECD on corporate governance of banks in Eurasia (2007–2009)
He has more than 20 years of experience of working as CEO  in the banking system of Georgia, sitting on the boards of the leading banks in  post-Soviet countries and Europe and is one of the pioneers of  the challenging reform process of financial sector of emerging countries.

Additional information
2002 – Doctor of Economic Sciences
1990 – Candidate of Sciences in Physis and Mathematics (PhD)

Bibliography
2016 – "The lessons of the global economic crisis and new development model formation", Tbilisi (in Russian)
2014 – "Modern Banking: Theory and Practice", Tbilisi  (in Georgian)
2011 – "Systemic and Borderline Banking Crises: Lessons Learned for Future Prevention",  iUniverrse Inc. New York, Bloomington  (in English)
2008 – "Economic and Banking System Development Trends and Prospects for Countries in Transition", iUniverse Inc., New York, Bloomington (in English)
2005 – "Economic and banking system development trends and prospects for countries in transition", Moscow (in Russian)
2003 – "Systemic banking crises in the conditions of financial globalization", Tbilisi (in Russian)
2001 – "Problems of Functioning of Georgian Commercial Banks on the current stage", Tbilisi (in Georgian)
1990 – "Some aspects of dimension theory of mesocompact spaces", Tbilisi (in Russian)

Politicians from Georgia (country)
1962 births
Living people
Alumni of the University of London
Economists from Georgia (country)